Luis Argel (born 1 September 1959) is an Argentine skier. He competed at the 1988 Winter Olympics and the 1992 Winter Olympics.

References

External links
 

1959 births
Living people
Argentine male biathletes
Argentine male cross-country skiers
Olympic biathletes of Argentina
Olympic cross-country skiers of Argentina
Biathletes at the 1988 Winter Olympics
Cross-country skiers at the 1992 Winter Olympics
Place of birth missing (living people)